In mathematics, logic and philosophy of mathematics, something that is impredicative is a self-referencing definition. Roughly speaking, a definition is impredicative if it invokes (mentions or quantifies over) the set being defined, or (more commonly) another set that contains the thing being defined. There is no generally accepted precise definition of what it means to be predicative or impredicative. Authors have given different but related definitions.

The opposite of impredicativity is predicativity, which essentially entails building stratified (or ramified) theories where quantification over lower levels results in variables of some new type, distinguished from the lower types that the variable ranges over. A prototypical example is intuitionistic type theory, which retains ramification so as to discard impredicativity.

Russell's paradox is a famous example of an impredicative construction—namely the set of all sets that do not contain themselves. The paradox is that such a set cannot exist: If it would exist, the question could be  asked whether it contains itself or not — if it does then by definition it should not, and if it does not then by definition it should.

Hence predicativism would reject this definition.

History 

Solomon Feferman provides a historical review of predicativity, connecting it to current outstanding research problems.

The vicious circle principle was suggested by Henri Poincaré (1905-6, 1908) and Bertrand Russell in the wake of the paradoxes as a requirement on legitimate set specifications. Sets that do not meet the requirement are called impredicative.

The first modern paradox appeared with Cesare Burali-Forti's 1897 A question on transfinite numbers and would become known as the Burali-Forti paradox. Cantor had apparently discovered the same paradox in his (Cantor's) "naive" set theory and this become known as Cantor's paradox. Russell's awareness of the problem originated in June 1901 with his reading of Frege's treatise of mathematical logic, his 1879 Begriffsschrift; the offending sentence in Frege is the following:

So why not substitute the value  for  itself? Russell promptly wrote Frege a letter pointing out that:

Frege promptly wrote back to Russell acknowledging the problem:

While the problem had adverse personal consequences for both men (both had works at the printers that had to be emended), van Heijenoort observes that "The paradox shook the logicians' world, and the rumbles are still felt today. ... Russell's paradox, which uses the bare notions of set and element, falls squarely in the field of logic. The paradox was first published by Russell in The principles of mathematics (1903) and is discussed there in great detail ...". Russell, after six years of false starts, would eventually answer the matter with his 1908 theory of types by "propounding his axiom of reducibility. It says that any function is coextensive with what he calls a predicative function: a function in which the types of apparent variables run no higher than the types of the arguments". But this "axiom" was met with resistance from all quarters.

The rejection of impredicatively defined mathematical objects (while accepting the natural numbers as classically understood) leads to the position in the philosophy of mathematics known as predicativism, advocated by Henri Poincaré and Hermann Weyl in his Das Kontinuum. Poincaré and Weyl argued that impredicative definitions are problematic only when one or more underlying sets are infinite.

Ernst Zermelo in his 1908 "A new proof of the possibility of a well-ordering" presents an entire section "b. Objection concerning nonpredicative definition" where he argued against "Poincaré (1906, p. 307) [who states that] a definition is 'predicative' and logically admissible only if it excludes all objects that are dependent upon the notion defined, that is, that can in any way be determined by it". He gives two examples of impredicative definitions – (i) the notion of Dedekind chains and (ii) "in analysis wherever the maximum or minimum of a previously defined "completed" set of numbers  is used for further inferences. This happens, for example, in the well-known Cauchy proof...". He ends his section with the following observation: "A definition may very well rely upon notions that are equivalent to the one being defined; indeed, in every definition definiens and definiendum are equivalent notions, and the strict observance of Poincaré's demand would make every definition, hence all of science, impossible".

Zermelo's example of minimum and maximum of a previously defined "completed" set of numbers reappears in Kleene 1952:42-42 where Kleene uses the example of least upper bound in his discussion of impredicative definitions; Kleene does not resolve this problem. In the next paragraphs he discusses Weyl's attempt in his 1918 Das Kontinuum (The Continuum) to eliminate impredicative definitions and his failure to retain the "theorem that an arbitrary non-empty set  of real numbers having an upper bound has a least upper bound (cf. also Weyl 1919)".

Ramsey argued that "impredicative" definitions can be harmless: for instance, the definition of "tallest person in the room" is impredicative, since it depends on a set of things of which it is an element, namely the set of all persons in the room.

Burgess (2005) discusses predicative and impredicative theories at some length, in the context of Frege's logic, Peano arithmetic, second-order arithmetic, and axiomatic set theory.

See also 
 Gödel, Escher, Bach
 Impredicative polymorphism
 Logicism
 Richard's paradox

Notes

References 
 
 PlanetMath article on predicativism
 John Burgess, 2005. Fixing Frege. Princeton Univ. Press.
 Solomon Feferman, 2005, "Predicativity" in The Oxford Handbook of Philosophy of Mathematics and Logic. Oxford University Press: 590–624.

 Stephen C. Kleene 1952 (1971 edition), Introduction to Metamathematics, North-Holland Publishing Company, Amsterdam NY, . In particular cf. his §11 The Paradoxes (pp. 36–40) and §12 First inferences from the paradoxes IMPREDICATIVE DEFINITION (p. 42). He states that his 6 or so (famous) examples of paradoxes (antinomies) are all examples of impredicative definition, and says that Poincaré (1905–6, 1908) and Russell (1906, 1910) "enunciated the cause of the paradoxes to lie in these impredicative definitions" (p. 42), however, "parts of mathematics we want to retain, particularly analysis, also contain impredicative definitions." (ibid). Weyl in his 1918 ("Das Kontinuum") attempted to derive as much of analysis as was possible without the use of impredicative definitions, "but not the theorem that an arbitrary non-empty set M of real numbers having an upper bound has a least upper bound (CF. also Weyl 1919)" (p. 43).
 Hans Reichenbach 1947, Elements of Symbolic Logic, Dover Publications, Inc., NY, . Cf. his §40. The antinomies and the theory of types (pp. 218 — wherein he demonstrates how to create antinomies, including the definition of impredicable itself ("Is the definition of "impredicable" impredicable?"). He claims to show methods for eliminating the "paradoxes of syntax" ("logical paradoxes") — by use of the theory of types — and  "the paradoxes of semantics" — by the use of metalanguage (his "theory of levels of language"). He attributes the suggestion of this notion to Russell and more concretely to Ramsey.
Jean van Heijenoort 1967, third printing 1976, From Frege to Gödel: A Source Book in Mathematical Logic, 1879-1931, Harvard University Press, Cambridge MA,  (pbk.)

Mathematical logic
Philosophy of mathematics
Self-reference
Concepts in logic
Recursion